Livistona chinensis, the Chinese fan palm or  fountain palm, is a species of subtropical palm tree of east Asia. It is native to southern Japan, Taiwan, the Ryukyu Islands, southeastern China and Hainan. In Japan, two notable populations occupy islands near the coast of Miyazaki Prefecture,  Aoshima and Tsuki Shima. It is also reportedly naturalized in South Africa, Mauritius, Réunion, the Andaman Islands, Java, New Caledonia, Micronesia, Hawaii, Florida, Bermuda, Puerto Rico and the Dominican Republic.

The leaves are fan shaped.

Cultivation
The palm is cultivated as an ornamental tree in gardens and conservatories. It is hardy in USDA zones 9-11, tolerating temperatures down to about 22° Fahrenheit/-6° Celsius.

This plant can become a weed, or in some ecosystems an invasive species, in places such as Bermuda, Hawaii, Florida wetlands and on some Caribbean Islands.

References

chinensis
Trees of Japan
Trees of China
Trees of Taiwan
Flora of the Ryukyu Islands
Garden plants of Asia
Ornamental trees